{{Speciesbox
 | taxon = Gloydius intermedius
 | authority  = (Strauch, 1868)
 | synonyms = * Trigonocephalus halys – Ménétries, 1832 (part)
 Trigonocephalus blomhoffii – Maack, 1859 (part)
 Trigonocephalus affinis – Günther, 1860 (part)
 Trigonocephalus intermedius Strauch, 1868 Halys intermedius – W. Peters, 1877
 Ancistrodon intermedius – Boulenger, 1896
 Agkistrodon blomhoffii intermedius – Stejneger, 1907
 Ancistrodon blomhoffii intermedius – Despax, 1913
 Ancistrodon halys intermedius – Nikolski, 1916
 Agkistrodon halys intermedius – Stejneger, 1925
 Ankistrodon halys intermedius – Pavloff, 1926
 Agkistrodon intermedius – F. Werner, 1929
 Ancistrodon halys intermedius viridis – Pavloff, 1932 (nomen illegitimum)
 Gloydius halys intermedius – Hoge & Romano-Hoge, 1981
 Agkistrodon intermedius intermedius – Gloyd & Conant, 1982
 Gloydius intermedius – Kraus, Mink & W.M. Brown, 1996
}}Common names: Central Asian pit viper, intermediate mamushi, Mongolian pit viper, more.

Gloydius intermedius is a venomous pitviper species endemic to northern Asia. Three subspecies are currently recognized, including the nominate subspecies described here.

Description
The body is relatively stout, and the snout is not upturned.

The scalation includes 7 supralabial scales, 23 rows of keeled dorsal scales at midbody, 149-165 ventral scales, and 32-48 subcaudal scales.

The color pattern is variable, but generally consists of 28-45 dark subquadrate dorsal blotches or crossbands that usually extend down the flanks as far as the first or second scale rows. Between these blotches are irregular light areas. A dark brown to black postorbital stripe is present, extending from the eye back to the angle of the jaw, outlined by a light line above, and by cream-colored supralabial scales below.

Common names
Common names for G. intermedius include Central Asian pit viper, intermediate mamushi, Mongolian pit viper, Central Asian pitviper.

Geographic range
G. intermedius is found in southeastern Azerbaijan, northern Iran, southern Turkmenistan, northwestern Afghanistan, southern Russia, Korea, northwestern China and Mongolia. The type locality given by Stejneger (1907) is "Governm. Irkutsk, East Siberia." Golay et al. (1993) give "Yesso (= Esso) Island, banks of Amur River and Khinggan (= Hinggan Ling) Mountain Range."

Subspecies

Etymology
The subspecific name, stejnegeri, is in honor of Norwegian-born American herpetologist Leonhard Stejneger.

References

External links

intermedius
Reptiles of Afghanistan
Reptiles of Azerbaijan
Snakes of China
Reptiles of Central Asia
Reptiles of Mongolia
Reptiles of Russia
Reptiles described in 1868
Reptiles of Iran